Adam Antes (11 August 1891 – 28 November 1984) was a German sculptor and graphic artist. He studied at the Technical University of Darmstadt. His work was part of the sculpture event in the art competition at the 1932 Summer Olympics.

References

1891 births
1984 deaths
20th-century German sculptors
20th-century German male artists
German male sculptors
Olympic competitors in art competitions
People from Worms, Germany
Technische Universität Darmstadt alumni